The 1888 Kentucky Derby was the 14th running of the Kentucky Derby. The race took place on May 14, 1888. The track was labeled as fast.

Full results

Payout
The winner received a purse of $4,740.
Second place received $500.
Third place received $200.

References

1888
Kentucky Derby
Derby
May 1888 sports events
1888 in American sports